Euploea redtenbacheri, the Malayan crow or Redtenbacher's crow is a butterfly in the family Nymphalidae. It was described by Cajetan Felder and Rudolf Felder in 1865. It is found in the Indomalayan realm and the Australasian realm.

Subspecies
E. r. redtenbacheri (Sulawesi, Burma, Malaya, Celebes, Moluccas)
E. r. leachii C. & R. Felder, [1865] (South Sulawesi)
E. r. coracina Hopffer, 1874 (North Sulawesi, Central Sulawesi)
E. r. spiculifera (Moore, 1883) (Buru, Ambon, Obi)
E. r. albiplaga (Fruhstorfer, 1899) (Banggai Island)
E. r. selayarensis Tsukada & Nishiyama, 1979 (Salayar)

Biology
The larva feeds on Strophanthus dichotomus.

Etymology
The name honours Ludwig Redtenbacher.

References

External links
Euploea at Markku Savela's Lepidoptera and Some Other Life Forms

Euploea
Butterflies described in 1865
Butterflies of Asia
Butterflies of Oceania
Taxa named by Baron Cajetan von Felder
Taxa named by Rudolf Felder